The Game or The Games may refer to:

Sports and games
 The Game (dice game) (German: Das Spiel), a dice game designed by Reinhold Wittig
 The Game (mind game), a mind game, the objective of which is to avoid thinking about The Game itself
 Charades (c. WWII American name)
 The Game (treasure hunt), a 24- to 48-hour treasure hunt / puzzlehunt / road rally
 The Game Headwear, a sports apparel and equipment company
 The Game, a nickname of American professional wrestler Triple H

College sports
 The Game (Harvard–Yale), an annual American college football game
 The Game (Michigan–Ohio State), an annual American college football game
 The Game (Hampden–Sydney vs. Randolph–Macon), an annual American college football game
 The Game (Cornell–Harvard), an annual American college ice hockey game

Literature
 The Game (Dryden book), a 1983 memoir by ice hockey player Ken Dryden
 The Game (London novel), a 1905 novel by Jack London
 The Game (King novel), a 2004 novel by Laurie R. King
 The Game (Jones novel), a 2007 novella by Diana Wynne Jones
 The Game (play), a 1916 play by Harold Brighouse
 The Game: Penetrating the Secret Society of Pickup Artists, a book by Neil Strauss
 The Game, a novel by A. S. Byatt
 The Game, a novel by Hans Ruesch
 The Game, a novel by Michael Hastings
 The Games, a 1968 novel by Hugh Atkinson
 Sherlockian game, also known as the Holmesian game, the Great Game or simply the Game, is the pastime of attempting to resolve anomalies and clarify implied details in the Sherlock Holmes stories while pretending that Holmes is an historical character

Films and television

Programs 
 The Game (Australian TV series), a program about Australian rules football
 The Game (American TV series), a comedy-drama series on The CW, BET, and Paramount +
 The Game (UK TV series), a drama series on BBC Two
 The Games (Australian TV series), a mockumentary about the 2000 Sydney Olympics
 The Games (UK TV series), a celebrity athletics competition
 The Game: Towards Zero, a South Korean TV series
 The Game, a UK 1991 TV series covering Sunday league football, hosted by Danny Baker

Episodes 
 "The Game" (Desperate Housewives)
 "The Game" (Girlfriends)
 "The Game" (Recess)
 "The Game" (Star Trek: The Next Generation)
 "The Game" (Stargate Atlantis)
 "The Games" (Sir Arthur Conan Doyle's The Lost World)

Film 
 The Games (film), a 1970 film directed by Michael Winner
 The Game (1997 film), a film directed by David Fincher, starring Michael Douglas and Sean Penn 
 The Game (1998 film), a Scottish TV movie set during the 1978 World Cup, directed by Haldane Duncan
 The Game (2010 film), a Ghanaian film
 The Game (Highlander), the series of battles to become "the one" among the Immortals, in the Highlander film and television franchise

Music

Performers
 The Game (rapper), American rapper

Albums
 The Game (Alyssa Reid album)
 The Game (Chico DeBarge album)
 The Game (Queen album)
 The Game (Richie Rich album)
 The Game (Sham 69 album)

Songs
 "The Game" (Alyssa Reid song)
 "The Game" (Common song)
 "The Game" (Disturbed song)
 "The Game" (DragonForce song)
 "The Game" (Echo & the Bunnymen song)
 "The Game" (Red Flag song)
 "The Game", a song by Cold Chisel from Twentieth Century
 "The Game", a song by Dive Dive
 "The Game", a song by Drowning Pool from WWF Forceable Entry
 "The Game", a song by End of Fashion from End of Fashion
 "The Game", a song by Jurassic Five from Quality Control
 "The Game", a song by Lacuna Coil from Karmacode
 "The Game", a song by The Levellers from Levelling the Land
 "The Game", a song by Motörhead from Hammered
 "The Game", a song by Nightingale from I
 "The Game", a song by Smash Mouth from Magic
 "The Game", a song by Soul Asylum from Candy from a Stranger
 "The Game", a song by Trapt from Trapt
 "The Game", a song from Damn Yankees
 "Fame (The Game)", a song by Donna Summer

Other media
 The Game (audio drama), a 2005 Doctor Who audio drama
 KGMZ-FM or 95.7 FM, "The Game", an all-sports FM radio station in San Francisco, California
 KXTG or 95.5 FM, "The Game", an all-sports FM radio station in Portland, Oregon

Other uses
 The Game, in Synanon, a truth-telling session
 "The game", a principle espoused by the 20th-century Greek philosopher Kostas Axelos

See also
 Game (disambiguation)
 The Game of the Century (disambiguation)
 The game of their lives (disambiguation)